Alyan Al-Qahtani (born 23 August 1971) is a Saudi Arabian long-distance runner. He competed in the men's 10,000 metres at the 1996 Summer Olympics.

References

1971 births
Living people
Athletes (track and field) at the 1996 Summer Olympics
Saudi Arabian male long-distance runners
Olympic athletes of Saudi Arabia
Place of birth missing (living people)
Asian Games medalists in athletics (track and field)
Asian Games bronze medalists for Saudi Arabia
Athletes (track and field) at the 1994 Asian Games
Athletes (track and field) at the 2002 Asian Games
Medalists at the 1994 Asian Games
20th-century Saudi Arabian people